The Miejski Stadion Piłkarski "Raków" is a football stadium in Częstochowa, Poland. The venue is located at the 83 Bolesław Limanowski Street in the Raków district. It is the home ground of the Raków Częstochowa football club.

History 
The Social Committee for Stadium Construction was established in 1951 on the initiative of Eng. Marian Zdunkiewicz. The facility was opened on July 22, 1955. In addition to the football field, a running track and an athletics hill were built. The capacity of the facility was approximately 8,000 people. The owner of the stadium was Huta Częstochowa. In 2003, the steelworks handed it over to the city.

After 1985, an announcer's tower and a training ground were built to the east of the stadium.

After the promotion of the Raków team to the I liga in the 2016/17 season, the stadium was adapted to league requirements by roofing 588 seats, repairing damaged stands, replacing the seats, as well as installing artificial lighting of the field. In addition, training pitches with back-up facilities were created. In February 2019, the capacity was increased to 4,200 seats.

Along with the promotion of Raków to Ekstraklasa in the 2018/2019 season, it was necessary to modernize the stadium in order to adapt it to the licensing requirements. In the years 2020-2021, the stands with 5500 seats were built, the turf heating system was installed and the facilities were rebuilt. The value of the investment is over PLN 17 million.

Major matches

1978 UEFA European Under-18 Championship

Polish Cup 
On April 10, 2019, a match of the Polish Cup semi-finals was played at the stadium, in which Raków Częstochowa lost 0–1 to Lechia Gdańsk. The meeting was watched by 4,820 people. 

On April 6, 2022, a match of the Polish Cup semi-finals was played at the stadium, in which Raków Częstochowa win 1–0 to Legia Warsaw. The meeting was watched by 5,500 people.

References

Częstochowa
Raków Częstochowa
Częstochowa
Sports venues in Silesian Voivodeship
Buildings and structures in Częstochowa